, also known as , was a Japanese journalist, novelist and a prolific translator, translating more than 100 French and English language novels into the Japanese language.

Kuroiwa founded  in 1892, which soon became one of Japan's largest newspapers.

In 1919, while on his way to the Paris Peace Conference, Kuroiwa met with Madam C. J. Walker of the International League for Darker People to discuss a shared strategy at the conference.

His Dharma name, which he chose himself, was Kuroiwain Shūroku Ruikō Chūten Koji (黒岩院周六涙香忠天居士).

Works
 On Hearing of the Devotional Self-Immolation of General Nogi (1912) published in English in Learning Sacred Way Of Emperor by Yukata Hibino.

Further reading

References

1862 births
1920 deaths
Japanese editors
Japanese writers
Japanese journalists
Japanese Buddhists
20th-century Buddhists